Ohara Davies (born 9 February 1992) is a British professional boxer. He held the WBC Silver light-welterweight title from 2016 to 2017 and challenged once for the Commonwealth light-welterweight title in 2017.

Professional career

Amateur career

According to BoxRec, Davies held an undefeated record of 18–0 as an amateur. In May 2015, Davies, speaking to BoxingMonthly, spoke about his amateur career: "I think that as an amateur I always had a style that was more suited to the pro game. I got told plenty of times in the gym that I’ve got more of a pro style so, when I did finally decide to turn over, I didn’t really have to make many adjustments."

Debut year as a professional (2014) 

Davies turned professional in 2014 and won on points in a four-round contest on his debut against Latvian fighter Ivans Levickis (9–12) on 19 April at the York Hall in London.

By the end of 2014, Davies held a record of 4–0 after knockout wins over Kristian Dochev (10–16), Andy Harris (3–18–1) and Oszkar Fiko (10–7). The latter two victories came on Matchroom Boxing shows.

Undefeated year (2015) 
Davies won all five of his contests in 2015, ending the year with a record of 9–0. He defeated Lee Gibbons (3–2), Jacek Wylezol (11–7), Simas Volosinas (6–30), Dame Seck (9–9–2) and Chris Truman (13–4–2), with Wylezol the only one to last the distance.

First title fights and move up to light-welterweight (2016) 
After defeating Ghana's Prince Ofotsu (15–5) in January, in March, Matchroom Boxing announced that Davies would fight for the vacant English lightweight against Andy Keates (11–3) The fight would take place on the undercard to Charles Martin vs. Anthony Joshua at The O2 Arena in London on 9 April.

Davies won by fourth-round knockout after knocking Keates down in the round one before knocking him out in round four.

Davies won both of his next two contests against Zoltan Szabo (9–0) and Chaquib Fadli (13–7), winning both inside the distance in non-title fights.

In October, Matchroom Boxing announced that Davies would fight WBC Silver champion Andrea Scarpa (20–2) at Wembley Arena. Davies won by unanimous decision with all three judges producing scorecards of 120–108.

Derry Matthews 

On 9 January Matchroom Boxing confirmed that Davies would defend his WBC Silver light-welterweight title against former lightweight world title challenger Derry Matthews (38–11–2) on the undercard to David Haye vs Tony Bellew at the O2 Arena on London on 4 March.

Davies won by third-round stoppage after twice knocking down Mathews down in the third round. Shortly after the fight, Mathews retired from boxing.

Josh Taylor 

On 19 May Cyclone Promotions announced that Davies would defend his WBC Silver title against undefeated Commonwealth champion Josh Taylor (9–0), with both titles at stake. The fight would take place at the Braehead Arena in Glasgow on 8 July.

Davies was dominated in the fight. He was knocked down in round three and then twice in round seven before the referee halted the contest, his first defeat as a professional.

Tom Farrell 
On 24 July Matchroom Boxing announced that Davies would fight undefeated Liverpool prospect Tom Farrell (13–0) for the vacant WBA International light-welterweight title on the undercard to Paul Butler vs Stuart Hall II at the Echo Arena in Liverpool on 30 September.

Davies won by sixth-round stoppage after knocking down Farrell once in round one, twice in round two and twice in round six.

2018 

On 27 April promoter Frank Warren confirmed that Davies would fight for the first time under his promotional banner against France's Christopher Sebire (26–10–1) on the undercard to Lee Selby vs Josh Warrington at the Elland Road Stadium in Leeds on 19 May. Davies went on to win via UD against Ismail Abdoul after Sebire pulled out. In the post fight interview Davies called out Jack Catterall and Terry Flanagan.

Davies vs. Vasquez 
On 28 June 2019, Davies fought Miguel Vasquez. Davies won the fight with the sole referee scoring it 97–94. Even Davies himself thought the score was too wide and even raised Vasquez's hand after the score was announced.

Davies vs. McKenna 
On 30 September 2020, Davies fought Tyrone McKenna. Davies won the fight via a narrow split-decision, 96–94, 96–94 and 95–95.

Davies vs. Barroso 
On 26 November 2021, Davies fought Ismael Barroso, who was ranked #2 by the WBA at super lightweight. Davies won the fight, with all three judges seeing it 99–91 in his favor.

Team 
Davies is currently promoted by Frank Warren's Queensberry Promotions, having previously been promoted by Eddie Hearn's Matchroom Boxing from 2014 to 2018.

He is managed by MTK Global, having signed with the company in January 2018. He was previously managed by Charlie Sims, the son of trainer Tony Sims.

He was previously trained by Babatunde Ajayi (2014) and Tony Sims (2014–18).

Professional boxing record

References

External links

Ohara Davies – Profile, News Archive & Current Rankings at Box.Live

1992 births
Living people
Black British sportspeople
People from Hackney Central
English male boxers
Boxers from Greater London
Lightweight boxers